Governor Thomson may refer to:

Charles Antoine François Thomson (1845–1898), Governor of Cochinchina from 1882 to 1885
Charles Poulett Thomson, 1st Baron Sydenham (1799–1841), Governor General of the Province of Canada from 1839 to 1841
Graeme Thomson (1875–1933), Governor of British Guiana from 1923 to 1925, Governor of Nigeria from 1925 to 1931, and 26th Governor of British Ceylon from 1931 to 1933
Ian Thomson (colonial administrator) (1920–2008), Governor of the British Virgin Islands from 1967 to 1971
Meldrim Thomson Jr. (1912–2001), 73rd Governor of New Hampshire
Vernon Wallace Thomson (1905–1988), 34th Governor of Wisconsin

See also
Governor Thompson (disambiguation)